General elections were held in Denmark on 4 December 1973 and in the Faroe Islands on 13 December. It has since been referred to as the Landslide Election, as five new or previously unrepresented parties won seats, and more than half the members of the parliament were replaced. The Social Democratic Party, which had led a minority government until this election, lost a third of their seats. After the election Poul Hartling, the leader of the liberal Venstre, formed the smallest minority government in Denmark's history with only 22 seats, supported by the Progress Party, the Conservative People's Party, the Social Liberal Party, the Centre Democrats and the Christian People's Party.

Voter turnout was 89% in Denmark proper, 55% in the Faroe Islands and 66% in Greenland.

Parties
The USSR covertly funded the Communist Party of Denmark.

Results

See also
The 2015 Danish general election was called Hofteskredsvalget in reference to the term Jordskredsvalget
Landslide victory
Political realignment

References

Elections in Denmark
Denmark
1973 elections in Denmark
December 1973 events in Europe

External links
 "Jordskredsvalget" on danmarkshistorien.dk